The Yin and the Yang of Mr. Go is a 1970 British thriller film directed by Burgess Meredith. It was shot in Hong Kong and Toronto, Canada.

Plot summary 
An American draft dodger and aspiring writer named Nero Finnigan (Jeff Bridges) becomes involved with the notorious Mr. Go (James Mason), an oriental organized crime mastermind. They conspire to blackmail an American weapons scientist into providing secrets to Mr. Go's organization for resale to the highest bidder. Leo Zimmerman, who is an American CIA agent and James Joyce scholar, then arrives and is charged with recovering the scientist and his work by whatever means necessary.

Cast 
James Mason as Y.Y. Go
Jack MacGowran as Leo Zimmerman
Irene Tsu as Tah-Ling
Jeff Bridges as Nero Finnegan
Peter Lind Hayes as Prof. Robert Bannister
Clarissa Kaye-Mason as Zelda
Burgess Meredith as The Dolphin
Gigo Tevzadze as Dr. Ading
King Hu as Ito Suzuki
Broderick Crawford as Parker
Jay Adler as Dr. Yul
June Sampson as Miss Hagen

Soundtrack 
 "The Yin and the Yang" (Music by Robert O. Ragland, lyrics by Marcia Waldorf)
 "To Be Free" (Music by Robert O. Ragland, lyrics by Marcia Waldorf)
 "Tah-Ling" (Music by Robert O. Ragland, lyrics by Marcia Waldorf)
 "Images and Reflections" (Music by Robert O. Ragland, lyrics by Marcia Waldorf)

References

Further reading 
 Lisanti, Tom, "Fantasy femmes of sixties cinema: interviews with 20 actresses from biker, beach, and Elvis movies", McFarland Publishing, 2001. Cf. pp.158-169 for entry on Irene Tsu which also has a discussion of the film on page 165.

External links 

1970 films
1970s mystery thriller films
British mystery thriller films
Films scored by Robert O. Ragland
1970s English-language films
1970s British films